Scott Allen Kozak  (born November 28, 1965) is a former American football linebacker in the National Football League (NFL). He played five seasons for the Houston Oilers (1989–1993). Kozak played college football for the University of Oregon. He was named Oregon's most outstanding football player for the 1989 season.

References

1965 births
Living people
Sportspeople from Hillsboro, Oregon
Players of American football from Oregon
American football linebackers
Oregon Ducks football players
Houston Oilers players